Things That We Drink To is the second studio album, and first American released by Australian country music singer Morgan Evans. The album was announced on 31 August 2018 and was released on 12 October 2018. The project is a musical reflection of Evans' journey from Australia to Nashville. Evans co-wrote each track alongside the album's producer, Chris DeStefano. The two played every instrument heard on the sonically diverse project, showcasing Evans' musicianship in addition to his adept songwriting.

At the ARIA Music Awards of 2019, the album won the ARIA Award for ARIA Award for Best Country Album.

Background
In 2016, Evans travelled from Australia to Nashville, Tennessee to make a new home in the United States. Morgan began songwriting and working alongside some of the industry's best who've helped him turn this journey into 11 songs. Evans told Taste of Country "I've learned to be more honest and tell my story rather than the story that I think someone wants to hear." Evans wrote hundreds of songs and culled the parts of his identity he hadn't yet shared into an album. Since moving to Nashville, Evans married fellow country star Kelsea Ballerini, embarked on his first American tour and released his first U.S. radio single, "Kiss Somebody" and lost his manager Rob Potts who died in a motor cycle accident in October 2017.

Critical reception
Taste of Country said "Celebration is an overall theme of Things That We Drink To as Evans looks back on the times that have defined him since he started building a new life on the other side of the world."

Chris Parton from Rolling Stone said called the album a "...breezy mix of up-tempo jams, lovestruck anthems and loop-driven creative mojo." adding "Things That We Drink To a truly revealing debut, both personally and artistically."

Commercial performance
Things That We Drink To debuted at No. 9 on Top Country Albums with 4,000 copies sold, or 7,000 in equivalent album units.  The album has sold 5,200 copies in the United States as of November 2018.

Track listing
From Nash Country Daily:

Personnel
Kelsea Ballerini – duet vocals on "Dance with Me"
Chris DeStefano – banjo, bass guitar, drums, acoustic guitar, electric guitar, piano, programming, background vocals
Morgan Evans - acoustic guitar, lead vocals, background vocals
David Hodges – piano
Katie Ohh – background vocals
Kirby Smith – background vocals 
Nir Z. – drums

Charts

Weekly charts

Year-end charts

Release history

References

2018 albums
Morgan Evans (singer) albums
Warner Records albums
ARIA Award-winning albums